Monochamus marmorator is a species of beetle in the family Cerambycidae. It was described by William Kirby in 1837. It is known from Canada.

References

marmorator
Beetles described in 1837